Marjorie Elizabeth Dulcie Bick (11 December 1915 – 18 October 2013) was an Australian biochemist.

Born the daughter of Charles William Bick of Sandringham, Marjorie studied at Firbank Girl's Grammar School from 1920 and matriculated in 1932 to undertake a Bachelor of Science degree at the University of Melbourne in 1937, then completed a Master of Science Degree at Melbourne in 1941.

Biochemist 
Bick began her career as a biochemist at the Walter and Eliza Hall Institute of Medical Research, which beside the Commonwealth Serum Laboratories, was then one of the few institutions offering women in Australia the opportunity of a scientific career. She was amongst a number of notable biochemists, mostly women, like Beryl Splatt and Lorna Silvester who had a major influence on the nation's development of clinical biochemistry, She worked in the field of blood transfusion specialising in the production of blood serum in the laboratory. 

In 1939 she was seconded to the Australian Red Cross Society (Victorian Division) Blood Transfusion Services. In 1940 she drove from Melbourne with Sheila Summons, Nancy Hayward and Kathleen Gilles to attend the Science Congress in Canberra where she discussed problems in blood transfusion with the Adelaide committee.

World War Two 
Bick was invited to the USA and Canada with Dr Lucy Bryce to study developments in blood transfusion,  and worked at Harvard University in the Plasma Fractionation Laboratory. Her research found a direct correlation between the platelet count of human blood, and its vasoconstrictor activity after clotting. Returning to Australia, she became biochemist to the Australian Red Cross Society, overseeing Victoria's Red Cross Blood Bank during WW2,  during which she held the rank of captain in the Australian Army Medical Corps. 

By 1944 she was Honorary Director of Training and Equipment at the Blood Bank in the Royal Melbourne Hospital and traveled again with Dr Bryce to study in America. They arrived on the S.S. Kanangoora in March 1945 and visited the Hooper Research Foundation in Los Angeles then traveled to New Orleans and Washington,  and attended a conference of the Blood Substitutes Committee of the National Research Council.  

Bryce then traveled to investigate clinical methods while Bick stayed on in Boston for eighteen months undertaking laboratory work on plasma fractionation in the Department of Physical Chemistry at Harvard Medical School under Professor Edwin J. Cohn, a pioneer in the field.  She and Bryce reported on war conditions and attitudes to Australia in America  and on the mass production methods at the Cutter Laboratories of packing and shipping plasma and whole blood to be parachuted into the Pacific war zones.  Their research coincided with a plan to expand the Blood Bank into a new floor of the Royal Melbourne Hospital.

Post-war career 
In 1949, Bick concluded nine years of work for the Red Cross Blood Transfusion Service and joined the Alfred Hospital as a Senior Biochemist where she oversaw the management and implementation of new laboratory procedures at the Hospital. Recipient of a Fulbright Scholarship in 1955, she studied new techniques in the USA at the Massachusetts General Hospital, Boston, and in the United Kingdom at the Isotope School of the Atomic Energy Commission and at University College, London.

Bick was a founding member and Victorian representative 1961–1963 of the Australasian Association of Clinical Biochemists (AACB) which was established 26 May 1961 during an ANZAAS Congress in Brisbane. 

Bick then pursued her interest in environmental science and was awarded a Research Scholarship for research at the National Institute of Environmental Health in North Carolina 1967–1969,  and then 1969–1971 worked as a biochemist at the Medical Research Council, Division of Clinical Chemistry, in the United Kingdom, publishing on the effect of human exposure to pesticides and to hydrocarbons. Her analysis by gas-liquid chromatography of biopsy specimens of human body fat collected in 1965 from 53 individuals found DDT-derived material and dieldrin present in all samples; a mean concentration of total DDT equivalent stored was 1.81 ppm, and the mean concentration of dieldrin was 0.046 ppm. In other investigations she found that occupational exposure to esterase inhibitors used as pesticides in a group of orchardists, when spraying with reasonable care, is sufficient to cause a decrease in red-cell acetylcholinesterase activity.

Bick returned to Australia in 1972 and worked in Pre-Clinical Drug Evaluation at the Department of Health in Canberra and during the 1970s and 80s contributed to Drug Toxicity Evaluation at the Therapeutic Goods Administration.

Personal life 
In the 1950s Bick was a member and secretary of the first all-women sailing club, The Victorian Ladies' Yacht Club. Retired in 1980, Bick ran a Victorian country Post Office and general store, later living in Canberra and then Brighton. She died on 18 October 2013.

Publications

References 

1915 births
2013 deaths
Australian women scientists
Australian biochemists
Australian haematologists
Australian scientists
Environmental scientists
WEHI staff
University of Melbourne alumni
University of Melbourne women
20th-century women scientists